Congoglanis sagitta is a species of catfish in the genus Congoglanis. It lives in the upper Congo River basin, specifically in tributaries of Lake Mweru, Luangwa River and Chambeshi River in Zambia. Its length reaches 13.6 cm.

References 

Amphiliidae
Freshwater fish of Africa
Fish described in 2011